Lygephila kishidai is a moth of the family Erebidae. It is found in Taiwan.

The length of the forewings is about 18 mm. The forewings are greyish brown, but the costal area is somewhat darker. The hindwings are also greyish brown, but slightly paler than the forewings.

References

 , 2010: On the distribution of Lygephila kishidai Kinoshita, 1989 (Lepidoptera: Noctuidae: Catocalinae). Tinea 21 (2): 70-73.
 , 1989: Two new species of the genus Lygephila Billberg from Taiwan (Lepidoptera: Noctuidae). Tyô to Ga 40 (2): 141-148. Abstract and full article: .

Moths described in 1989
Toxocampina